Everald Hanse (died 31 July 1581) was an English priest and a martyr of the Roman Catholic Church.

Life
Everald Hanse was born in Northamptonshire and educated at Cambridge. He was soon presented to a good living. His brother William, who had become a priest in April 1579 tried to convert him, but in vain until a sharp attack of illness made him enter into himself. He then resigned his rich preferments, and went over to Reims in northern France (1580–1581). He was ordained 25 March 1581 and returned, but his ministry was very short. 
 
In July he was visiting in disguise some Catholic prisoners in the Marshalsea, when the keeper noticed that his shoes were of a foreign make. He was closely examined, and his priesthood was discovered. As yet there was no law against priests, and to satisfy the hypocritical professions of the persecutors, it was necessary to find some treason of which he was guilty. He was asked in court at the Newgate Sessions, what he thought of the pope's authority, and on his admitting that he believed him "to have the same authority now as he had a hundred years before", he was further asked whether the pope had not erred (i.e. sinned) in declaring Queen Elizabeth I excommunicated, to which he answered, "I hope not." His words were at once written down as his indictment, and when he was further asked whether he wished others to believe as he did, he said "I would have all to believe the Catholic faith as I do." A second count was then added that he desired to make others also traitors like himself. He was at once found guilty of "persuasion" which was high treason by Elizabeth. He was therefore in due course sentenced and executed at Tyburn on 31 July 1581. 
 
The trial is noteworthy as one of the most extreme cases of verbal treason on record, and it was so badly received that the Government had afterwards to change their methods of obtaining sentences. The martyr's last words were "O happy day!" and his constancy throughout "was a matter of great edification to the good". The Spanish ambassador wrote: "Two nights after his death, there was not a particle of earth on which his blood had been shed, which had not been carried off as a relic."

See also
 Catholic Church in the United Kingdom
 Douai Martyrs

References

Sources

English beatified people
Year of birth missing
1581 deaths
16th-century venerated Christians
Executed people from Northamptonshire
Executed Roman Catholic priests
Forty-one Martyrs of England and Wales